Cleveland Rock may refer to:

 Snow Peak (Oregon), a summit in the Oregon Cascades
 Bay of Isles#Charting and naming of features, an Antarctic island named in 1980 for Benjamin D. Cleveland